Norakhpyur (Armenian: Նորախպյուր)  is a village in the Shirak Province of Armenia.

References 

Populated places in Shirak Province